Sir William Peel  (27 February 1875 – 24 February 1945) was a British colonial administrator who served as Governor of Hong Kong.

Early life
Peel was born in Hexham, Northumberland, England. He was the son of Rev. W. E. Peel of Boston Spa in Yorkshire. He attended Silcoates School and later Queens' College, Cambridge.

Early Colonial Services
He became a cadet in the Colonial Service in British Malaya in 1897 and was soon promoted to Acting District Officer of Nibong Tebal in 1898 and Bukit Mertajam in 1899 and Province Wellesley until 1901. His next appointment as Acting Second Colonial Secretary took him to Singapore in 1902 until his return to Penang in 1905 to serve as Acting Second Magistrate and Coroner. After serving as Acting Auditor in 1908 in Penang, he continued his service in various capacities in the Federated Malay States such as Acting Secretary to the Resident of Selangor in 1909 and Acting District Officer Lower Perak in 1910, before returning to Penang as President of the Municipal Commissioners Penang in 1911. He became Acting Resident Councillor of Penang from (26 February – 5 October 1917). Later, he became president of the municipal commissioners of Singapore in 1918. In 1919, he was appointed as joint passage controller of labour for the Federated Malay States and Straits Settlements in 1920; and chairman of European Unemployment Committee in 1921. In 1922, he became British Adviser for the Government of Kedah. He became Acting Resident Councillor of Penang from 10 May to 9 July 1925.  In 1927, he acted as officer administering the government and High Commissioner for the Malay States, having been promoted to be Chief Secretary to Government in 1926.

Governor of Hong Kong
On 9 May 1930, Peel was appointed as Governor of Hong Kong. During his tenure, the telephone system in Hong Kong was automated, and the first permanent flight between China and Hong Kong was established. Also, Peel presided over the construction of a Governor's Retreat in Fanling, in the New Territories.

Peel retired in May 1935.

Personal life
Peel married to Violet Mary Drake, daughter of the late W. D. Laing by whom he had two sons.

Places named after him
Peel Rise in Hong Kong is a hiking trail connecting Aberdeen Reservoir Road and Peak Road. and Peel Avenue in Penang were named after him. In addition, the Violet Peel Health Centre was named after his wife. The Peel Block of King George V School is named after him. Jalan Peel (Peel Road) in Kuala Lumpur was named after him too.

References

External links

Genealogy

Governors of Hong Kong
Colonial Administrative Service officers
Alumni of Queens' College, Cambridge
Knights Commander of the Order of St Michael and St George
Knights Commander of the Order of the British Empire
1875 births
1945 deaths
Governors of Penang
People from Hexham
People educated at Silcoates School
20th-century Hong Kong people
20th-century British politicians
British people in British Hong Kong
British people in British Malaya